Mode C veil refers to a kind of airspace which currently surrounds all primary Class B airports within the United States. This airspace extends horizontally to a circle of 30 NM radius centered on the airport, and extends vertically from the surface up to 10,000 feet MSL. The name refers to the mode of transponder operation which is required within this airspace — that is, with very limited exceptions, all aircraft operating within this airspace must have an altitude-reporting Mode C transponder in operation.

, all 37 Class B airports in the United States have Mode C veils centered on them. Prior to November 2014, two Class B airports did not have a Mode C veil (at least de jure): William P. Hobby Airport in Houston and Marine Corps Air Station Miramar in San Diego.

Mode C veils were implemented after the collision of Aeromexico Flight 498 and a Piper Archer on  August 31, 1986 within the terminal control area of Los Angeles airport.

References

Air traffic control in the United States